Adam Elliot (born 2 January 1972) is an Australian stop-motion animation writer, director and producer based in Melbourne, Australia. His five films have collectively participated in over seven hundred film festivals and have received over one hundred awards, including an Academy Award for Harvie Krumpet and five Annecy Cristals. Elliot calls himself an auteur filmmaker and each of his films have a bittersweet nature to them. He does not engage with commercial work and works exclusively on his own film projects. Based loosely on his family and friends, Elliot calls each of his works a Clayography – clay animated biography. Each film takes up to five years to complete. He is noted for his use of traditional 'in-camera' techniques, which means every prop set and character is a 'real' miniature handcrafted object. Elliot does not use digital additions or computer generated imagery to enhance his visual aesthetic. His company, Adam Elliot Clayographies, produce the films and Elliot's work practices adhere to the French auteur methodology. Each film has been voiced by notable actors including, Philip Seymour Hoffman, Toni Collette, Geoffrey Rush, Eric Bana, William McInnes , Barry Humphries and John Flaus. Elliot is also a voting member of the Academy of Motion Picture Arts and Sciences and in 1999 was awarded The Young Achiever of the Year for Victoria.

Biography
Elliot was born in Berwick, Victoria, and raised in the Australian outback on a prawn farm by his father, Noel, a retired acrobatic clown, and his mother Valerie, a hairdresser; he has three siblings, Samantha, Luke and Joshua. After the farm went bankrupt, Elliot's father moved the family to the city of Melbourne, where he bought a small hardware shop. A very shy child, Elliot was very creative and was constantly drawing and making things out of found objects. He attended the Pinewood Primary State School in the suburb of Mount Waverley and then Haileybury College, Keysborough, where he was proficient at Art, English literature, Photography, Drawing and Sculpture. Elliot had an early ambition to be a veterinarian but did not obtain the necessary grades to enter university. In extra-curricular activities Elliot was a member of the school's Highland Pipe Band. He also pursued acting and in his final year was awarded the school's highest honour, the A.G. Greenwood Trophy for an outstanding dramatic performance as Dr. Watson in the Sherlock Holmes play "The Incredible Murder of Cardinal Tosca". Born with a hereditary physiological tremor, Elliot incorporated his disability into his visual aesthetic with his work displaying uneven lines and an organic feel. After completing his year twelve, he spent five years hand-painting T-shirts at the St Kilda, Victoria Esplanade Craft market. In 1996 he completed a postgraduate diploma in film and television, specialising in animation, at the Victorian College of the Arts. There he made his first stopmotion film, Uncle, which won numerous film awards and participated in various international and local film festivals. Since then, in collaboration with the Australian Film Commission, Screen Australia, Film Victoria (formerly Cinemedia), and the Special Broadcasting Service (SBS), Elliot has made four more short films: Cousin, Brother, Harvie Krumpet, Ernie Biscuit and a feature, Mary and Max. Elliot is gay and thanked his boyfriend, who he was still involved with as of 2016, in his acceptance speech upon winning an Academy Award for Best Animated Short for Harvie Krumpet, becoming one of the first people to thank their same-sex partners while accepting Oscars.

Uncle (1996)
Made in 1996, Elliot's first short film was created at the Victorian College of the Arts under the tutelage of Sarah Watt, Robert Stephenson and Ann Shenfield. With a running time of six minutes Uncle won numerous international awards including an Australian Film Institute Award for Best Australian Animated Short. The film was shot with a 16mm Bolex camera using completely traditional stopmotion techniques, and edited on a Steenbeck, a now obsolete linear editing system. These traditional techniques taught Elliot a craft that would influence his later works and provide a strong respect for handcrafted films. To date he refuses to apply any digital effects to his films despite economic and aesthetic pressures. The budget for Uncle was approximately A$4000. Uncle is semi-biographical, about an anonymous uncle narrated by an anonymous nephew, voiced by William McInnes. Extremely static and minimalist, the story is driven by the narration and is a balance between comedy and tragedy, humour and pathos. Using strong archetypes, the story has a timeless and universal feel. To date, the film is still popular at Film Festivals (often as part of a retrospective on Elliot). This first short by Elliot sets the tone for all his subsequent works and is a reference point for his visual style and aesthetic. The story is loosely based on Elliot's own relationship with his eight uncles, yet despite factual references, he always places an emphasis on story; for him actual events should never dictate plot. In interviews he often cites the popular adage, that "the truth should not get in the way of a good story".

Cousin (1998)
Made in 1997, Cousin was Elliot's first professional film funded by the Australian Film Commission, SBS Independent and Film Victoria. As with Uncle, Elliot chose a minimalist approach and sparse narration to drive a very simple remembrance of a childhood relationship he had with his cousin (based on his real-life cousin), who has cerebral palsy. Like Uncle, Cousin has a greyscale palette but was shot on colour stock. This film was shot in a small storage unit in the outer suburb of Moorabin in Melbourne at a facility owned by his father. This time Elliot employed AVID digital equipment to edit the footage shot on 16mm film. Cousin has been shown at many film festivals and won Elliot his second AFI Award for Best Australian animation. Narrated again by William McInnes, the budget for Cousin was $42,000 AUD.

Brother (1999)
Thanks to the success of his first two shorts, Brother became the natural conclusion to what is now referred to as a trilogy. Funded by the Australian Film Commission and SBS Independent, this short explores the childhood memories of Elliot's brother. In several interviews Elliot has stated that it is his most factual and autobiographical film and that the Brother is in fact himself. Brother marks the height of Elliot's minimalist approach and aesthetic. He made it in a friend's spare bedroom above falafel shop in the bohemian inner city suburb of Fitzroy, Melbourne. Elliot set strict rules for himself: the film should be made in a completely analog fashion using a limited amount of tools and equipment. In keeping with his purist ideals, he edited it on a Steenbeck, rejecting the offer of the use of a computer. Like the two previous chapters of the trilogy, Brother was narrated by William McInnes. It traveled to many international festivals, winning Elliot two AFI Awards: one for Best Australian Short Animation and one for best Australian Short Screenplay. The budget for Brother was $52,000 AUD.

Harvie Krumpet (2003)

Running for 23 minutes, this next film marked Elliot's slow venture into colour and the establishment of much more complex, longer and dynamic plot structures. While still using the narrator to drive the story, his animation became more dynamic and the storylines more complex. This film was made back at his father's storage facility and was the first time Elliot has substantial assistance from a full-time producer, Melanie Coombs, and two model making assistants, Michael Bazeley and Sophie Raymond. He also used the mentoring skills of Darren Burgess, an experienced animator from Adelaide. The film took over a year to shoot on a modified super 16mm Bolex and was the first time Adam used new digital software that assisted in the viewing of captured frames. This new software has since revolutionised stop motion animation, so animators no longer have to wait for dailies and can see their work played back in real time immediately after frames are gathered. They no longer have to animate "blind". On average Elliot shot between five and ten seconds of footage per day. The budget to the film was AUD380,000; it was narrated by the Academy Award-winning actor Geoffrey Rush, with character voices by Kamahl, John Flaus and Julie Forsythe. In 2004 the film won an Academy Award for Best Short Animation. Harvie Krumpet has played at over 100 film festivals and won over forty major awards. In 2005 it was named as one of the top 100 animated films of all time by the board of the world's largest animation festival in Annecy, France.

Mary and Max (2009)

Elliot's first feature film had its world premiere at the Sundance Film Festival in January 2009 and was the first animated film and first Australian film in the festival's 25-year history to screen in the coveted opening night slot. The 92-minute film was made in Elliot's hometown of Melbourne and took five years to complete at a cost of 8.3 million Australian dollars. The project required a crew of over 120 people and a team of six animators who shot continuously for 57 weeks. For the narration, Elliot employed the services of the iconic comedian and stage performer Barry Humphries. Max is voiced by Academy Award-winning actor Philip Seymour Hoffman, Mary by Toni Collette and Damian by Eric Bana. Molly Meldrum and Renee Geyer provided cameo voices. Elliot was determined that young Mary should be voiced by a real eight-year-old girl and, after auditioning over 40 actresses, finally chose Bethany Whitmore. From 2 March to 6 June 2010, Mary and Max was showcased in a free exhibition at the Australian Centre for the Moving Image (ACMI). "Mary and Max: The Exhibition" provided a behind-the-scenes insight into the making of the film. Items on display included character models, costumes, storyboards, props (meticulously crafted miniature hand-blown wine glasses, a working typewriter, light bulbs) and footage of the animators at work. The film is currently included in IMDb as one of the top 250 highest-rated films of all time.

Ernie Biscuit (2015)
Elliot's most current clayography, Ernie Biscuit, is a 20-minute black-and-white short animated stop motion film exploring the life of a deaf Parisian taxidermist. In a similar style to his Academy Award-winning Harvie Krumpet, this film is a bittersweet biography that has both comedic and tragic elements. For the first time, Elliot has explored stronger themes of love, and the overall style is quite dynamic and fast-paced. It is lighter in tone to his other shorts and is narrated by long-time collaborator John Flaus, who has voiced Elliot's previous films Harvie Krumpet, Mary and Max and Uncle. The film has been selected into official competition at the Annecy International Animation Festival and had its European premiere in June 2015. Ernie Biscuit won Best Short Animation at the 5th AACTA Awards.

References

External links

 Adam Elliot official website
 
 Mary and Max official site
 Olivier Cotte (2007) Secrets of Oscar-winning animation: Behind the scenes of 13 classic short animations. (Making of '"Harvie Krumpet"'') Focal Press. 

Australian animated film directors
Australian animated film producers
1972 births
Australian motivational speakers
Australian animators
Directors of Best Animated Short Academy Award winners
Film directors from Melbourne
Victorian College of the Arts alumni
Living people
People educated at Haileybury (Melbourne)
LGBT animators
Australian gay artists
Stop motion animators
21st-century Australian LGBT people
Artists from Melbourne